Santa Rita District, Alto Paraná Department, Paraguay, was established  4 December 1989 by Law 58/90 sanctioned 16 March 1990.

References 

 
States and territories established in 1989